Public transport in Esplugues de Llobregat (Catalonia, Spain) has been improved in recent years with the introduction of tram lines for the surrounding region in 2004, which provided better interconnection between municipalities and the capital Barcelona. This locality belonging to the Metropolitan Area of Barcelona and located in the comarca of Baix Llobregat (formerly in Barcelonès until 1990) is a wealthy suburb of the neighbouring Barcelona.

Barcelona Metro stations
Located right in the border between the two municipalities of Esplugues de Llobregat and L'Hospitalet de Llobregat, with an only access indeed located in Esplugues:

Tram stations
From the 2000s onwards improved rail connection with Barcelona has existed with the introduction of Trambaix.

See also
Transport in Badalona
Transport in Barcelona
Transport in Castelldefels
Transport in Cornellà de Llobregat
Transport in Montcada i Reixac

External links
Esplugues de Llobregat city council.

 
Transport in Baix Llobregat